In 1926, Arkansas renumbered its highways into a more traditional format. The system to be replaced was established in 1924 as Arkansas' first comprehensive highway plan. Roads were designated as "primary federal aid roads", "secondary federal aid roads", or "connecting state roads". The Arkansas State Highway Commission implemented the system of United States Numbered Highways also around 1926, and thus Arkansas decided to number its highways and to drop the 1924 letter-number format. This resulted in the first true numbering of state highways in Arkansas.  The U.S. route designations  61, 63, 64, 65, 67, 70, 71,  165, and  167 would have conflicted with state highway designations, so there were no Arkansas state highways with these numbers. The highest number was 115, with 116 and up reserved for future use.

1926 routes

References
Arkansas State Highway and Transportation Department, Historic Arkansas Tourist Maps, especially the 1926 maps

 Renumbering 1926
Arkansas State Highway Renumbering, 1926
State Highway numbering, 1926
History of Arkansas